The Ormiston Yew is first mentioned in text in 1474. It is a layering yew, and is thought to be one of the most significant examples in Scotland.  It is located in Ormiston, Scotland,

Photo gallery

References

External links 
 official website

Individual yew trees
Individual trees in Scotland
Ormiston